Brewbaker v. Regents, - N.W.2d - (Iowa 2013), was a unanimous decision of the Iowa Court of Appeals dated October 23, 2013, that held it does not violate double jeopardy or separation of powers for an administrative agency to modify the terms of probation to deny State educational services following a criminal judgement hearing if the modification protects "the integrity of the community".

Issues
Double jeopardy, Separation of powers, Free speech, Due process, Equal protection, and Abuse of discretion

Prior proceedings
Brewbaker was charged with simple misdemeanor annoying speech. Under Iowa Court Rule 2.67(6) Brewbaker was only allowed a jury of six members. Upon a guilty verdict Brewbaker was fined $65 in the District Court for Story County Iowa on an annoying speech conviction in November 2009 and placed on one year of probation. Brewbaker applied for discretionary appeal to the Iowa Supreme Court on grounds that the term 'annoying' was void for vagueness, see Coates v. Cincinnati, but the application was denied.

Subsequently the Iowa Board of Regents in a public hearing upheld a modification to Brewbaker's probation suspending him from State educational services at Iowa State University for the same transaction as the simple misdemeanor. Brewbaker's application for review of agency action to the District Court for Polk County was denied.

Subsequent proceedings
Brewbaker applied for further review on November 12, 2013 noting Vogel gave a false account of the facts in Kocher to frame it as controlling instead of Dressler where the conviction preceded administrative sanctions.

The Iowa Supreme Court denied further review. On March 3, 2014 Iowa Court of Appeals Chief Judge Danielson entered an order for publication. Publication, if accepted by the Iowa Supreme Court, would also overturn Klouda v. Sixth Judicial Dist. Dept. giving the Iowa executive branch new powers to independently modify conditions of probation set by criminal courts.

See also
 Ex parte Lange.

References

Iowa state case law
2013 in United States case law
2013 in Iowa
Iowa State University
United States administrative case law
United States Double Jeopardy Clause case law
United States education case law